Naty "El Gato" Alvarado (born in Ciudad Juárez, Mexico) is a former player of handball.  According to the United States Handball Association's hall of fame entry, he is  the "[t]he most dominating, winningest handball player" in the history of handball.  His style was characterized by an aggressive two-hand offense. "He won his first national championship in 1977 at St. Louis...." He was dominant in the 1980s.  He won "63 professional tournaments over a 14-year period."  A Mexican national, Alvarado entered the United States illegally but was granted U.S. permanent residency under an amnesty program in the 1980s.  His son, Naty, Jr., is also a member of the USHA Hall of Fame.

References

Living people
American male handball players
Sportspeople from Ciudad Juárez
Year of birth missing (living people)
Mexican expatriate sportspeople in the United States